Daniel Geismayr (born 28 August 1989) is an Austrian racing cyclist, who currently rides for UCI Mountain Bike Team Trek–Pirelli.

Major results
2017
 1st  Overall Swiss Epic (with Jochen Käss)
 7th Overall Tour de Savoie Mont Blanc
2018
 7th Overall Oberösterreichrundfahrt

References

External links
 

1989 births
Living people
Austrian male cyclists
Place of birth missing (living people)
Austrian mountain bikers